Alfred Deliallisi (born 28 March 1993) is an Albanian footballer who plays as a central midfield for Vora in the Albanian First Division

External links
Alfred Deliallisi at Soccerway

1993 births
Living people
People from Shijak
Footballers from Durrës
Albanian footballers
Association football midfielders
Albania youth international footballers
Albania under-21 international footballers
KF Teuta Durrës players
Besa Kavajë players
FC Kamza players
KF Erzeni players
FK Vora players
Kategoria Superiore players
Kategoria e Parë players